

Changes for the 2004 Season
 Autobacs becomes title sponsor.
 Introduction of the D1 Gals who would appear at each event. Previously to that, the series used girls who were represented by other sponsors.
 Cars are now required to bear the D1GP sponsor box, containing the series' sponsors logos, at the side of the car at each event.
 Cars are now required to bear the D1GP orange sun visor, containing the series logo and the company logo, at each event.

2004 Schedules
n.b. Winning Driver are mentioned on the right

2004 D1 Grand Prix Point Series
Round 1 - February 27/28  - Irwindale Speedway, Irwindale, California, United States - Yasuyuki Kazama (S15)
Round 2 - May 4/5 - Sports Land SUGO (Go-Kart circuit), Miyagi Prefecture, Japan - Yasuyuki Kazama (S15)
Round 3 - July 24/25 - Ebisu South Course, Fukushima Prefecture, Japan - Ken Nomura (ER34)
Round 4 - August 21/22 - Autopolis, Ōita Prefecture, Japan - Nobuteru Taniguchi (S15)
Round 5 - September 18 - Metropolitan Parking, Odaiba, Japan - Ryuji Miki (S15)
Round 6 - October 23/24 - Ebisu South Course, Fukushima Prefecture, Japan - Youichi Imamura (FD3S)
Round 7 - November 25 - Tsukuba Circuit, Ibaraki Prefecture, Japan - Youichi Imamura (FD3S)

2004 D1 Grand Prix Exhibition Matches
D1 Pre-Season Match - January 17 - Metropolitan Parking, Odaiba, Japan - Kuniaki Takahashi  (JZX100)
D1 Exhibition - Apr. 17 - Metropolitan Parking, Odaiba, Japan - Ken Nomura (ER34)
D1 Odaiba Allstar Match - Apr. 18 - Metropolitan Parking, Odaiba, Japan - Yasuyuki Kazama (S15)
D1 Odaiba Allstar Match - Sep. 19 - Metropolitan Parking, Odaiba, Japan - Youichi Imamura (FD3S)
D1 USA vs Japan Allstar - December 17 - California Speedway, Fontana, California, United States - Nobushige Kumakubo (S15)

Final Championship Results

Source: D1GP Official Site 2004 Championship table

See also
 D1 Grand Prix
 Drifting (motorsport)

Sources
D1GP Results Database 2000-2004

D1 Grand Prix seasons
D1 Grand Prix
2004 in Japanese motorsport